Conrad Smith (born April 12, 1981 in Port of Spain) is a Trinidad and Tobago football player.

Career

Professional
Smith attended Malick Secondary Comprehensive School, and was part of the youth team of Trinidadian side Caledonia AIA, before turning professional in Canada in 2004 with the Calgary Mustangs in the old USL First Division. He returned to Trinidad and played extensively in the Trinidadian TT Pro League, for San Juan Jabloteh, Caledonia AIA, and Joe Public, with whom he won a league champions medal in 2009.

Smith was signed by FC Edmonton of the new North American Soccer League in 2011, and made his debut for Edmonton in the team's first competitive game on April 9, 2011, a 2-1 victory over the Fort Lauderdale Strikers. The club released Smith on October 12, 2011 after the conclusion of the 2011 season.

International
Smith made his debut for the Trinidad and Tobago national team in 2001 and has since gone on to play for the Soca Warriors 24 times, scoring 5 goals.

References

External links
 FC Edmonton bio
 

1981 births
Living people
Trinidad and Tobago footballers
Trinidad and Tobago international footballers
Calgary Mustangs (USL) players
Toronto Lynx players
San Juan Jabloteh F.C. players
TT Pro League players
Morvant Caledonia United players
Joe Public F.C. players
FC Edmonton players
Sportspeople from Port of Spain
USL First Division players
North American Soccer League players
Expatriate soccer players in Canada
Association football forwards